Jolene Campbell (born Jolene McIvor on August 12, 1981) is a Canadian curler from Regina, Saskatchewan. She currently plays third on Team Chelsea Carey.

Curling career

Junior career
Born in Saskatoon, Campbell won a provincial junior title in 2002, skipping a team consisting of Teejay Surik, Janelle Lemon and Maegan Strueby. At the 2002 Canadian Junior Curling Championships she led Saskatchewan to a third-place finish, after losing in the semifinal to Prince Edward Island's Suzanne Gaudet.

2007–2012
Campbell and her team of Sherry Linton, Allison Slupski and Marcia Gudereit, would win the Schmirler Curling Classic in 2007.

Campbell was the alternate for the Amber Holland rink. She played in three Scotties to date as a member of the team, going 6-5 in 2010 and 2012 and winning it in 2011. The team won a silver medal at the 2011 Capital One World Women's Curling Championship in Denmark. Campbell was seven months pregnant at the time. 

At the 2012 Scotties Tournament of Hearts, Holland would utilize Campbell as fifth player, when Tammy Schneider was injured. Campbell would play six out of eleven round robin games, and finished round robin with the highest player percentages amongst seconds.

2012–2014
From 2012-2014, Campbell played third for the Amber Holland rink which included Brooklyn Lemon and Dailene Sivertson at front end. Campbell won one World Curling Tour event as a member of the Holland rink, the 2013 Boundary Ford Curling Classic. The team placed third at the 2013 Saskatchewan Scotties Tournament of Hearts and tied for fifth at the 2014 Saskatchewan Scotties Tournament of Hearts. After the season, Campbell left the Holland rink to form her own team, including former Scottish champion Kelly Schafer (formerly Wood), Teejay Haichert and Kelsey Dutton.

Personal life
Campbell is a graduate from the University of Saskatchewan and works as a communications officer with the Regina Police Service.  She is married to Greg Campbell and has three children.

References

External links

1981 births
Curlers from Saskatoon
Curlers from Regina, Saskatchewan
Living people
Canadian women curlers
Canadian women's curling champions
Canadian mixed curling champions
Canada Cup (curling) participants
20th-century Canadian women
21st-century Canadian women